Evelina Traykova (born 2 November 1986) is a Bulgarian footballer who plays as a midfielder. She has been a member of the Bulgaria women's national team.

References

1986 births
Living people
Women's association football midfielders
Bulgarian women's footballers
Bulgaria women's international footballers
FC NSA Sofia players